Gim Allon, also known as Colossal Boy, Leviathan, and Micro Lad, is a superhero appearing in books published by DC Comics, primarily as a member of the Legion of Super-Heroes in the 30th and 31st centuries. Created by writer Jerry Siegel and artist Jim Mooney, the character first appeared in Action Comics #267 (August 1960).

He has gone by a variety of superhero names over the past several decades, although originally (and most commonly) Colossal Boy. His name's similarity to the standard Israeli surname Allon led writer Paul Levitz in 1980 to identify the character as Jewish.

In the 1990s, the entirety of the Legion of Super-Heroes were changed in what was referred to as a "reboot" of those characters' continuity, including Allon. Later on, these superheroes were again rebooted in what has been referred to as the "threeboot" of the Legion of Super-Heroes.

Fictional character biography

Original continuity

Gim Allon was mutated by a radioactive meteorite, gaining the superhuman ability to increase his size. His superhero codename became Colossal Boy. With his parents' blessing, he joined the Legion of Super-Heroes, becoming a member in good standing. He had an unreciprocated crush on fellow Legionnaire Shrinking Violet; this crush was only returned when Violet was replaced by a shapeshifting impostor, a Durlan named Yera. The two were married; when the deception was exposed, he discovered that he was still in love with Yera, and they remained married. For a time, Colossal Boy's mother Marte Allon was the President of Earth.

During the "Five Year Gap" following the Magic Wars, Gim joined the Science Police and ultimately never returned to the Legion. Earth fell under the covert control of the Dominators and withdrew from the United Planets. A few years later, the members of the Dominators' highly classified Batch SW6 escaped captivity. Originally, Batch SW6 appeared to be a group of teenage Legionnaire clones, created from samples apparently taken just prior to Ferro Lad's death at the hands of the Sun-Eater. Later, they were revealed to be time-paradox duplicates, every bit as legitimate as their older counterparts. After Earth was destroyed in a disaster reminiscent of the destruction of Krypton over a millennium earlier, a few dozen surviving cities and their inhabitants reconstituted their world as New Earth. The SW6 Legionnaires remained, and their version of Colossal Boy assumed the code name Leviathan.

1994 reboot

In 1994, following the events of the Zero Hour crossover, the original continuity of the Legion ended and their story was restarted from the beginning. In this continuity, Gim Allon was known as Leviathan and was from Mars instead of Earth. He was still human, as Mars had been colonized by humans in this continuity. Like his previous counterpart, he was a Science Police officer who was given his powers after being grazed by a meteorite.

He was the first official leader of the team, but he resigned after one mission, following the death of the first Kid Quantum and realizing that Cosmic Boy was more suited to the role. Cosmic Boy persuaded him to retain some leadership as deputy.

Allon then became ensconced in a love triangle. While he nursed a crush on Kinetix, Shrinking Violet nursed a crush on him. This ended in tragedy when the Emerald Eye, on orders from Violet to give each member of the team their heart's desire, caused him to die in battle with Doctor Regulus, fulfilling his wish to have a heroic death. He also passed along his ability to grow to tremendous size to Violet.

2004 reboot

In the 2004 relaunch, Gim Allon is a member of race of giants created by Bizarro Brainiac 200 years prior to the start of the 31st century. Allon considers his superpower to be the ability to shrink to six feet tall and prefers the code name Micro Lad. Still, all Legionnaires, as well as the public in general, know him as Colossal Boy. He often affects a bemused manner with his comrades, enjoying his time spent with "little people". Gim is often both the first and last Legionnaire in a fight, as his size grants him first strike ability as well as serving useful in the cleanup operations which inevitably follow.

An Imskian villain used the name Micro Lad in the original continuity.

Post-Infinite Crisis
The events of the Infinite Crisis miniseries have apparently restored a close analogue of the Pre-Crisis Legion to continuity, as seen in "The Lightning Saga" story arc in Justice League of America and Justice Society of America, and in the "Superman and the Legion of Super-Heroes" story arc in Action Comics. Colossal Boy is included in their number, along with his wife Yera (who has taken the name Chameleon Girl).

In the "Watchmen" sequel "Doomsday Clock", Colossal Boy is among the Legion of Super-Heroes members that appear in the present after Doctor Manhattan undid the experiment that erased the Legion of Super-Heroes and the Justice Society of America.

Powers and abilities
As Colossal Boy or Leviathan, Gim Allon has the ability to increase his size into many times normal height, with strength proportionate in mass. But as Gim, he possesses expertise in law enforcement. In the 2004 reboot of the Legion of Super-Heroes, Micro Lad comes from a race of humans that are giant-sized normally and he possesses the power to shrink. The smallest size he can reach is 6 feet (183 centimeters) tall.

Equipment
As a member of the Legion of Super-Heroes, he is provided with his own Legion Flight Ring, which allows him to fly and survive in the vacuum of space and other dangerous environments. Brainiac 5 modified his ring so it would enlarge with him, thus supporting the additional mass.

In other media
 Colossal Boy made a cameo in the Justice League Unlimited episode "Far From Home".
 Colossal Boy appears in Legion of Super Heroes, voiced by Adam Wylie. He has a minor role in season 1, but has a larger, recurring role in the second season.

References

Characters created by Jerry Siegel
Characters created by Jim Mooney
DC Comics metahumans
DC Comics aliens
DC Comics American superheroes 
DC Comics characters who are shapeshifters
DC Comics characters with superhuman strength
DC Comics extraterrestrial superheroes
Fictional American Jews
Fictional characters who can change size
Fictional characters with superhuman durability or invulnerability
Fictional police officers
Jewish superheroes